By Request: More of the Greatest Live Show on Earth is a live album by Jerry Lee Lewis. It was released on Smash Records in 1966.

Recording
The album is a sequel to Lewis's 1964 recording The Greatest Live Show on Earth and was recorded at Panther Hall in Fort Worth, Texas on August 20, 1966.  The intimate venue was a regional success and had hosted shows by many country stars, including Bob Wills, George Jones, Wanda Jackson and Willie Nelson, who recorded his own live album there two months earlier.  In his book Jerry Lee Lewis: Lost and Found, Joe Bonomo writes that Lewis's third live LP "though thinly recorded and sloppily edited, is a pretty tough country album.  It's hardly Concert at Carnegie Hall with Buck Owens and the Buckaroos or Johnny Cash at Folsom Prison, but in hindsight it was a tentative step towards Jerry Lee's commercial rebirth."  The album did not chart.

When he appeared on George Klein's Memphis Sounds program in 2011, Lewis gave producer Shelby Singleton credit for his determination to get a hit record: "It took us a while to get off the ground over there but Shelby Singleton, he didn't give up.  He said, 'I'm gonna put you back where you belong, right on top.'"

Track listing
"Little Queenie" (Chuck Berry)
"How's My Ex Treating You" (Vic McAplin)
"Johnny B. Goode" (Chuck Berry)
"Green, Green Grass of Home" (Curly Putman)
"What'd I Say, Part II" (Ray Charles)
"You Win Again" (Hank Williams)
"I'll Sail My Ship Alone" (Moon Mulligan)
"Cryin' Time" (Buck Owens)
"Money" (Gordy, Jr./Bradford)
"Roll Over Beethoven" (Berry)

Jerry Lee Lewis albums
1966 live albums